Windows Support Tools is a suite of management, administration and troubleshooting tools for Windows 2000, Windows XP, Windows Server 2003 and Windows Server 2003 R2 from Microsoft.

Overview
These tools are not installed with the Windows operating system and have to be separately installed. They are located on the Windows Installation CD, Support folder, Tools subfolder. They can also be downloaded from Microsoft Download Center.

Windows Server 2003 Support Tools includes 70 different tools. For instance, WinDiff is a GUI tool for comparing files and folders. NetDiag is a CLI tool for diagnosing network problems. This tool is command-line version of the Network Troubleshooter that can be found in Windows Help and Support Center. Windows Installer Zapper (msizap.exe, a command-line tool) and Windows Installer CleanUp Utility (Msicuu.exe, a GUI tool) are tools for cleaning Windows Installer databases in Microsoft Windows. Many of the Windows Resource Kit tools are included as part of the Support Tools. Although no x64 Resource Kit tools have been produced by Microsoft, some support tools are available in native x64 versions on the Windows XP Professional x64 and Windows Server 2003 x64 Editions CDs.

See also
Help and Support Center
Ntdetect.com
Windows Installer CleanUp Utility

References

External links

Microsoft Windows Tech Center
Microsoft Windows Server 2003 Tech Center: Windows Support Tools
Alphabetical list of tools

Microsoft Download Center
Windows 2000 Service Pack 4 Support Tools
Windows Server 2003 Service Pack 2 32-bit Support Tools
Windows XP Service Pack 2 Support Tools

Windows administration
Microsoft software